Brazilian Military Junta may refer to:

 Brazilian Military Junta of 1930, a provisional military body which governed Brazil in 1930
 Brazilian Military Junta of 1969, a provisional military body which governed Brazil in 1969